The Galatasaray S.K. Football Academy (Turkish: Galatasaray Spor Klubü Futbol Akademisi) is a football youth academy based in Florya Metin Oktay Facilities, Istanbul, Turkey, from where the organization manages a total of 11 youth teams (ages between 8–19). The academy is the primary youth clinic of Turkish footballing giants Galatasaray.

History
Galatasaray Futbol Akademisi is famous for having produced and still producing many great Turkish internationals like Arda Turan, Emre Belözoğlu, Bülent Korkmaz, Tugay Kerimoğlu, Okan Buruk and Ozan Kabak.

Squads

U-19 Squad

Football Academy Administrative and Technical Staff

References

External links
 Galatasaray Official Website
 U-21 Süper Ligi stats at TFF
 U-19 Elite Ligi stats at TFF
 U-17 Elite Ligi stats at TFF

Football academies in Turkey
UEFA Youth League teams
Galatasaray S.K. (football)